This is a list of notable individual and organizations who publicly indicated support for Donald Trump in the 2020 United States presidential election.

Businesspeople

Miriam Adelson, philanthropist, doctor and wife of Sheldon Adelson
Sheldon Adelson, founder and chairman of the Las Vegas Sands Corporation (Deceased after 2020 Election but before Biden inauguration)
Jeff Ballabon, media executive and lobbyist
Ronnie Barrett, gun manufacturer and CEO of Barrett Firearms Manufacturing
Jordan Belfort, former stockbroker, convicted felon, author of The Wolf of Wall Street and motivational speaker
Wayne Berman, businessman and senior managing director for government relations at The Blackstone Group
Blair Brandt, real estate entrepreneur
Flavio Briatore, Italian businessman
Herman Cain, businessman, former Chair of the Federal Reserve Bank of Kansas City and former 2000 and 2012 Republican presidential candidate (Deceased)
John Catsimatidis, chairman and CEO of Gristedes
Safra Catz, banker and CEO of Oracle Corporation
Dan DeVos, businessman, sports executive
James L. Dolan, executive chairman and CEO of The Madison Square Garden Company and executive chairman of MSG Networks
Bob Dello Russo, businessman and golf course owner
Dan Eberhart, CEO of Canary, LLC
Tim Eyman, businessman
Frank Fertitta III, CEO of Station Casinos
Lorenzo Fertitta, director of Red Rock Resorts
Tilman Fertitta, chairman, CEO, and sole owner of Landry's, Inc.
William P. Foley, chairman of Fidelity National Financial and Black Knight Financial Services
Charlie Gerow, CEO of Quantum Communications
Keith Gilkes, political strategist
Michael Glassner, President of C&M Transcontinental and political advisor
Harold Hamm, oil and gas tycoon
Charles Herbster, agribusiness executive
Heather Higgins, businesswoman, CEO of Independent Women's Voice and chair of Independent Women's Forum
William Hornbuckle, President and CEO of MGM Resorts International
Charles B. Johnson, billionaire businessman
Suhail A. Khan, director of external affairs at Microsoft
Shalabh Kumar, industrialist 
Jimmy Lai, British Hong Kong entrepreneur and founder of Giordano, Next Digital and Apple Daily 
Mike Lindell, founder and CEO of My Pillow
Nick Loeb, businessman and son of John Langeloth Loeb Jr.
Howard Lorber, businessman, CEO of Vector Group and chair of Douglas Elliman and Nathan's Famous
Palmer Luckey, entrepreneur and founder of Oculus VR
Donald Luskin, chief investment officer of Trend Marcolytics LLC
Howard Lutnick, chair and CEO of Cantor Fitzgerald
John C. Malone, billionaire businessman, landowner and philanthropist
Bernard Marcus, co-founder of Home Depot
Blake Masters, venture capitalist and President of the Thiel Foundation
Fernando Mateo, businessman and 2021 New York mayoral candidate. (He would later lose in the Republican primary)
Wendy McCaw, businesswoman and owner of Santa Barbara News-Press
Scott McNealy, businessman and CEO of Sun Microsystems
Tim Michels, Vice President of Michels Corporation
Tom Monaghan, entrepreneur, founder of Domino's Pizza
Arte Moreno, CEO of Outdoor Systems and owner of the Los Angeles Angels
Robert Murray, founder and CEO of Murray Energy (Deceased)
Terry Neese, businesswoman
Dennis Nixon, CEO of International Bank of Commerce and chairman of International Bancshares Corporation
Geoffrey Palmer, Los Angeles real estate developer
Prem Parameswaran, President of Eros International’s North American operations
John Paulson, hedge fund manager and founder of Paulson & Co.
Nelson Peltz, businessman, chairman of The Wendy's Company and director of Legg Mason, Procter & Gamble, Sysco, and Madison Square Garden Sports
John Pence, political consultant
T. Boone Pickens, business magnate (Deceased)
Brock Pierce, director of the Bitcoin Foundation, former actor (rescinded endorsement to start his own campaign)
Andy Puzder, former CEO of CKE Restaurants
Eddie Rispone, businessman and Republican candidate for the 2019 Louisiana gubernatorial election
Stephen Ross, owner of the Miami Dolphins and chairman of The Related Companies
Larry Rubin, Mexican-American businessman and President of The American Society of Mexico
Phil Ruffin, owner of the Treasure Island Hotel and Casino and Circus Circus Hotel & Casino
Ned Ryun, CEO of American Majority
John Schnatter, founder and former CEO of Papa John's Pizza
Jeffrey Shockey, lobbyist
Lisa Song Sutton, entrepreneur and real estate investor
Dean Stoecker, CEO of Alteryx
Peter Thiel, entrepreneur, president of Clarium Capital and co-founder of PayPal and Palantir Technologies
Donald Trump Jr., businessman, former reality television personality and son of Donald Trump
Eric Trump, businessman, former reality television personality and son of Donald Trump
Tiffany Trump, socialite and daughter of Donald Trump
J.D. Vance, venture capitalist
Kelcy Warren, businessman and CEO of Energy Transfer Partners
Dana White, businessman and President of the Ultimate Fighting Championship
Dede Wilsey, philanthropist and socialite
Cindy Yang, businesswoman

Actors and actresses

Kirstie Alley
Samaire Armstrong
Scott Baio
Stephen Baldwin
Roseanne Barr
Jim Breuer
Dean Cain
Stacey Dash
Robert Davi
Jimmy Failla
Laurence Fox
Kelsey Grammer
Namrata Singh Gujral
Kalani Hilliker
Thomas Jane
Yaphet Kotto
Lorenzo Lamas
Artie Lange
Brandi Love
Lila Morillo
Chuck Norris
Chonda Pierce
Joe Piscopo
Dennis Quaid 
Randy Quaid
Antonio Sabàto Jr.
Rick Schroder 
Kevin Sorbo
Sam Sorbo
Ben Stein
Kristy Swanson
Carolina Tejera
Eduardo Verástegui
Jon Voight
Isaiah Washington
James Woods
Veronica Yip

Television personalities

Rachel Campos-Duffy, television personality
Cepillín, Mexican clown (Deceased)
Naked Cowboy, singer and street performer
Jana Duggar, reality TV personality
Jenelle Evans, reality TV personality
Pete Evans, Australian chef, author, TV presenter
Rick Harrison, reality TV personality
Mary Hart, former host of Entertainment Tonight
Elisabeth Hasselbeck, retired TV personality, talk show host
Pete Hegseth, television host
Lady MAGA, drag queen
Carol McGiffin, British TV presenter
Elizabeth Pipko, model, author, founder of Jexodus
Carrie Prejean, model, former beauty queen
Willie Robertson, reality TV personality on Duck Dynasty, CEO of Duck Commander
Andre Soriano, reality television star, fashion designer
Chuck Woolery, former game show host, talk show host

Musicians

50 Cent (switched endorsement to Biden)
6ix9ine
Trace Adkins
Skunk Baxter
The Beach Boys (Only touring members Mike Love and Bruce Johnston. non-touring, but official members Brian Wilson and Al Jardine endorsed Biden)
Kodak Black
Fivio Foreign
Chingo Bling
Pat Boone
Jonathan Cain
Eric Carmen
Willie Colón
Asian Doll
John Dolmayan
Polow da Don
Terry Fator
Sean Feucht
Ace Frehley
Richie Furay
Danny Gokey
Michale Graves
Lee Greenwood
Jaheim
Kaya Jones
Brian Kelley
Lil Pump
Aaron Lewis
Lil Wayne
Mike Love
Lillibeth Morillo
Paty Navidad
Wayne Newton
Ted Nugent
Styles P
Ricky Rebel
Kid Rock
Liliana Rodríguez
Johnny Rotten
Yaakov Shwekey
Steve Souza
George Strait
Michael Sweet
Michael Tait
Travis Tritt
Tommy Vext
Joy Villa
Waka Flocka Flame
Beri Weber
Kanye West (rescinded endorsement to start his own campaign)

Sports figures

American football
Rita Benson LeBlanc, former Vice Chairman of the Board of the New Orleans Saints
Bobby Bowden, retired college football coach for the Florida State Seminoles football team (Deceased)
Jack Brewer, former National Football League player
Jim Brown, former fullback for the Cleveland Browns
Mike Brown, executive and owner of the Cincinnati Bengals
Jay Cutler, former professional football player
John Elway, former professional football player, president and manager of the Denver Broncos
Brett Favre, former professional football player
Mike Ditka, retired NFL coach
Lou Holtz, former football player, coach, and analyst
Richie Incognito, professional football player
Ed Orgeron, college football coach who served at Louisiana State University
Burgess Owens, retired football player and 2020 Republican nominee for the U.S. House in Utah’s 4th district. (He would later win said election)
Maurkice Pouncey, former professional football player
Mike Shula, quarterbacks coach for the Denver Broncos
Dimitrious Stanley, former professional football player
Tommy Tuberville, former football player, coach, and 2020 Republican U.S. Senate Nominee in Alabama (He would later win said election)
Michael Turk, punter for the Sun Devils
Herschel Walker, former professional football player

Baseball
Patrick Corbin, professional baseball pitcher for the Washington Nationals
Johnny Damon, former Major League Baseball player
Sean Gilmartin, Major League Baseball player
Aubrey Huff, former Major League Baseball player
Mike Piazza, former professional baseball catcher
Mariano Rivera, former baseball pitcher for the New York Yankees
Curt Schilling, former professional baseball pitcher
Darryl Strawberry, former professional Major League Baseball player
Kurt Suzuki, baseball catcher for the Los Angeles Angels
David Wells, former professional baseball pitcher
Joe West, Major League Baseball umpire

Basketball
Jim Buss, part-owner and former executive vice president of basketball operations of the Los Angeles Lakers
Bob Cousy, retired professional basketball player

Boxing
Don King, boxing promoter
Mike Tyson, former professional boxer

Car racing
Richard Childress, former professional stock car racing driver and owner of Richard Childress Racing
Timmy Hill, professional stock car racing driver
Carl Long, professional stock car racing driver and owner of MBM Motorsports
Corey LaJoie, professional stock car racing driver
Roger Penske, businessman and entrepreneur involved in professional auto racing, retired professional auto racing driver
Jack Roush, founder, CEO, and co-owner of Roush Fenway Racing
Tim Viens, professional stock car racing driver
Austin Wayne Self, professional stock car racing driver

Golf
John Daly, professional golfer
Ginger Howard, professional golfer
Jack Nicklaus, retired professional golfer
Greg Norman, Australian professional golfer and entrepreneur

Ice hockey
Todd Bertuzzi, former professional ice hockey player
Ilya Bryzgalov, former Russian professional ice hockey goaltender
Don Cherry, ice hockey commentator, former professional ice hockey player and head coach
Tony DeAngelo, professional ice hockey player
Peter Karmanos Jr., minority owner and alternate governor of the Carolina Hurricanes hockey franchise
Ryan Kesler, professional ice hockey player
Bobby Orr, former professional ice hockey player
Ryan Poehling, professional ice hockey player
Alexander Radulov, Russian professional ice hockey player

Mixed martial arts
Ali Abdelaziz, Egyptian mixed martial arts manager
Andrei Arlovski, professional mixed martial artist
Henry Cejudo, Olympic medalist in freestyle wrestling and retired mixed martial artist
Colby Covington, professional mixed martial artist
Justin Gaethje, professional mixed martial artist
Cody Law, professional mixed martial artist
Héctor Lombard, professional mixed martial artist
Jorge Masvidal, professional mixed martial artist
Pat Miletech, retired professional mixed martial artist
Conor McGregor, retired professional mixed martial artist
Tito Ortiz, professional mixed martial artist

Other
Lanny Barnes, biathlete
María Gabriela Franco, Venezuelan sport shooter and Olympic athlete
Rob Jones, Paralympic medalist in rowing and U.S. Marine Corps veteran
Klete Keller, Olympic medalist in freestyle swimming
Mike Matusow, professional poker player
Kim Rhode, Olympic medalist in double trap
Rick Roeber, long-distance runner
Quinn Simmons, cyclist

Wrestling
Mark Calaway, aka The Undertaker, retired WWE legend
Road Dogg, retired WWE wrestler
Dan Gable, Olympic medalist in freestyle wrestling
Jake Hager, professional mixed martial artist, current AEW and former WWE wrestler
Chris Jericho, current AEW and former WWE wrestler
Sean Morley, retired WWE wrestler
Dan Rodimer, former professional wrestler and Republican nominee for Nevada's 3rd congressional district in the 2020 elections (He would later lose said election)
Jaxson Ryker, former WWE wrestler

Academic figures and scholars 

Mor Altshuler, Israeli scholar and author
A.D. Amar, scholar, researcher and management professor at Seton Hall University
Hadley Arkes, political scientist and James Wilson Institute on Natural Rights & the American Founding
Larry P. Arnn, President of Hillsdale College
Mark Bauerlein, professor of English at Emory University
Jay Bergman, professor of Russian History at Central Connecticut State University
Russell Berman, professor of German studies and comparative literature at Stanford University
Sanjai Bhagat, economist and Provost Professor of Finance at the Leeds School of Business
Walter Block, the Harold E. Wirth Eminent Scholar Endowed Chair in Economics at the School of Business at Loyola University New Orleans
Daniel Bonevac, professor of philosophy at University of Texas at Austin
Robert Bradley Jr, economist and founder of Institute for Energy Research
Jennifer S. Bryson, Communication Fellow at Claremont Institute
Frank H. Buckley, professor at the Antonin Scalia Law School
Tony Campbell, professor of political science at Towson University
Allan C. Carlson, former professor at Hillsdale College and President Emeritus of the Howard Center for Family, Religion and Society
Angelo M. Codevilla, professor emeritus of international relations at Frederick S. Pardee School of Global Studies at Boston University
Christopher Demuth, lawyer and Distinguished Fellow at Hudson Institute
John C. Eastman, professor of law at the Chapman University School of Law
Bruce P. Frohnen, professor of law at Ohio Northern University College of Law
David Gelernter, professor of computer science at Yale University and Unabomber victim
Paul Gottfried, Paleoconservative philosopher, historian, columnist and former Horace Raffensperger Professor of Humanities in Elizabethtown College
Paul Roderick Gregory, professor of economics at the University of Houston
Earl Grinols, economist and political scientist at Baylor University
Mark David Hall, Herbert Hoover Distinguished Professor of Politics and Faculty Fellow in the William Penn Honors Program at George Fox University
Victor Davis Hanson, professor emeritus of classics at California State University, Fresno, the Martin and Illie Anderson Senior Fellow in classics and military history at Stanford University's Hoover Institution
William Happer, professor emeritus of physics at Princeton University
Steven Hayward, senior resident scholar at the Institute of Governmental Studies at UC Berkeley and Senior Fellow at the Pacific Research Institute
He Qinglian, Chinese economist
John D. Johnson, former professor at the Jon M. Huntsman School of Business
Charles R. Kesler, professor of government at Claremont McKenna College and Claremont Graduate University
Sergiu Klainerman, mathematician and professor of mathematics at Princeton University
Robert C. Koons, professor of philosophy at the University of Texas
Michael I. Krauss, professor of law at George Mason University
Stanley Kurtz, Senior Fellow at the Ethics and Public Policy Center
Arthur Laffer, economist
Michael Ledeen, foreign policy analyst and historian
Thomas K. Lindsay, former president at Shimer College
John R. Lott Jr., economist and gun rights advocate
Kevin MacDonald, retired professor of psychology at California State University, Long Beach and conspiracy theorist
Joyce Lee Malcolm, Patrick Henry Professor of constitutional law and the second amendment at the Antonin Scalia Law School
Theodore Roosevelt Malloch, professor of strategic leadership and governance at the Henley Business School
Javier Milei, Argentine economist and author
Peter Morici, economist and retired professor of international business at the University of Maryland, College Park
Robert L. Paquette, former professor of American history at Hamilton College and co-founder of the Alexander Hamilton Institute for the Study of Western Civilization
Ronald J. Pestritto, professor of politics at Hillsdale College
James Piereson, scholar and President of the William E. Simon Foundation
Juliana Geran Pilon, Senior Fellow at the Alexander Hamilton Institute for the Study of Western Civilization
Everett Piper, former President of Oklahoma Wesleyan University
Daniel Pipes, historian, writer and President of the Middle East Forum
Paul Rahe, professor of history at Hillsdale College
Glenn Reynolds, Beauchamp Brogan Distinguished Professor of Law at the University of Tennessee College of Law
Timothy P. Roth,  A.B. Templeton Professor and Chairman of the Department of Economics and Finance at the University of Texas at El Paso
Paul Rubin, economist and Samuel Candler Dobbs Professor of Economics Emeritus at Emory University
Fred Siegel, Senior Fellow at the Manhattan Institute for Policy Research and history professor at Cooper Union
Barry S. Strauss, professor of history and classics at Cornell University
Chin Wan, Hong Kong scholar and activist
Robert Weissberg, professor emeritus of political science at the University of Illinois
Peter Wood, President of the National Association of Scholars
Xia Yeliang, former associate professor of economics at Peking University

Activists and public figures

Scott Adams, cartoonist and creator of the comic strip Dilbert (previously unendorsed Trump)
Sohrab Ahmari, Iranian columnist for the New York Post
Saba Ahmed, Pakistani lawyer and activist
Baked Alaska, neo-Nazi, anti-Semitic conspiracy theorist and social media personality
Ali Alexander, far-right activist and social media personality
Jake Angeli, QAnon supporter later known for storming the United States Capitol
Christopher R. Barron, cofounder of GOProud
Cole Baritromo, blogger and former scammer
Maria Bartiromo, television personality and author, former host of Closing Bell
Kaitlin Bennett, conservative and gun rights activist
Josh Bernstein, talk show host
 Gary Buechler, YouTube personality
Lauren Boebert, businesswoman, gun-rights activist, and 2020 Republican nominee for the U.S. House for Colorado's 3rd district (eventual winner)
Dan Bongino, conservative activist, radio host, and former Secret Service agent
Deneen Borelli, conservative author, radio and television personality, columnist
Peter Boykin, political commentator and founder of Gays for Trump
L. Brent Bozell, founder and President of Media Research Center
Michael Brown, radio host and author
Tammy Bruce, radio host and political commentator
Jon Caldara, libertarian activist and President of Independence Institute
Kat Cammack, political advisor
Tucker Carlson, political commentator and host of Tucker Carlson Tonight
John Catanzara, Chicago police officer and President of the Chicago Fraternal Order of Police
Madison Cawthorn, Republican nominee for North Carolina's 11th congressional district in the 2020 elections. (He would later win said election.)
Chen Guangcheng, Chinese civil rights activist
Piers Corbyn, meteorologist and conspiracy theorist
Jeff Crank, radio host
Steven Crowder, American-Canadian conservative political commentator, YouTuber and comedian
Joe Dallas, conversion therapy advocate
Jim Daly, President of Focus on the Family
Marjorie Dannenfelser, president of the Susan B. Anthony List
Mark Davis, commentator and radio host
Paris Dennard, conservative political speaker
John Derbyshire, writer, computer programmer and journalist
Casey DeSantis, wife of Ron DeSantis 
Lou Dobbs, television commentator, opponent of immigration, and radio show host
Dinesh D'Souza, far-right political author, filmmaker, and conspiracy theorist
Larry Elder, conservative radio host and attorney
Tarek Fatah, Pakistani-Canadian journalist and author
Edwin Feulner, activist, founder and former President of The Heritage Foundation
Yishai Fleisher, podcaster and columnist
Kyle Forgeard, YouTuber and member of the NELK
Ryan Fournier, co-founder of Students for Trump
Mike Francesca, sports talk radio host
James Freeman, journalist, author and assistant editorial page editor at The Wall Street Journal
Nick Fuentes, far-right political commentator, podcaster and white nationalist
Brigitte Gabriel, author, anti-Islam activist and founder of ACT! for America
Day Gardner, President of The National Black Pro Life Union
Duncan Garner, New Zealand journalist and radio host
Rick Gates, political consultant, lobbyist and convicted felon
Pamela Geller, anti-Muslim and far-right political activist and commentator, blogger, birther, and conspiracy theorist
Madison Gesiotto, conservative commentator, columnist, figure skater, model, beauty queen
Joey Gibson, leader of Patriot Prayer
Bernard Goldberg, journalist and political pundit
Alan Gottlieb, conservative activist and gun rights advocate
 Jeremy Griggs, YouTube personality
Thomas Glessner, lawyer and president of the National Institute of Family and Life Advocates
Marjorie Taylor Greene, conspiracy theorist, far-right political activist and Republican nominee for Georgia's 14th congressional district in 2020 (She would later win said election)
Kimberly Guilfoyle, prosecutor, television news personality, senior advisor for Donald Trump 2020 presidential campaign, partner of Donald Trump Jr., and First Lady of San Francisco (2004–2006)
Greg Gutfeld, television producer, commentator, author, editor and comedian, host of The Greg Gutfeld Show (Libertarian)
Marco Gutierrez, activist and founder of Latinos for Trump
 Jeremy Hambly, YouTube personality
Sean Hannity, talk show host and conservative political commentator, host of Hannity and talk radio show The Sean Hannity Show
Hugh Hewitt, radio show host and attorney
Steve Hilton, political commentator and former British political advisor
Josh Holstein, university student
Katie Hopkins, British political commentator and columnist
David Horowitz, conservative activist and author
Hu Xijin, Chinese journalist and editor for the Global Times
Deal W. Hudson, conservative political activist
Charles Hurt, journalist, author and political commentator
Carl Iannone, writer
Stella Immanuel, American-Cameroonian physician and pastor
Laura Ingraham, radio host and host of The Ingraham Angle
Niger Innis, activist, politician
Scott Jennings, conservative commentator
Abby Johnson, anti-abortion activist, former clinic director at Planned Parenthood
Alice Marie Johnson, criminal justice reform advocate and former federal prisoner (sentence commuted in June 2018 by Trump and then granted full pardon in August 2020)
Benny Johnson, political columnist, chief creative officer at Turning Point USA, former editor at BuzzFeed
Alex Jones, far-right radio show host, political extremist and conspiracy theorist
Jason Jones, film producer, anti-abortion activist
Rabia Kazan, Turkish author and women's rights activist (endorsement rescinded)
Keemstar, YouTube personality
Roger Kimball, conservative social commentator
 Ryan Kinel, YouTube personality
Charlie Kirk, founder and leader of Turning Point USA
Amy Kremer, Tea Party activist and co-founder for Women for Trump
Bob Kroll, President of the Police Officers Federation of Minneapolis
Chris LaCivita, political consultant
Tomi Lahren, conservative political commentator and former television host
Wayne LaPierre, executive vice president of the National Rifle Association 
Seth Leibsohn, conservative talk show host and author
Leonard Leo, lawyer, conservative activist
Mark Levin, lawyer and radio host of The Mark Levin Show
Corey Lewandowski, lobbyist and political commentator
JT Lewis, gun rights activist
David Limbaugh, political commentator and author
Rush Limbaugh, political commentator and host of the radio show The Rush Limbaugh Show
James Lindsay, mathematician and author
Scott Lively, anti-gay activist and President of the Abiding Truth Ministries
Laura Loomer, conspiracy theorist, far-right political activist and Republican nominee for Florida's 21st congressional district in 2020 (She would later lose said election)
Jeffrey Lord, political commentator and strategist
Gina Loudon, conservative media personality
Patrick Lynch, President of the Police Benevolent Association of the City of New York
Matthew Lynn, British writer and financial columnist
Myron Magnet, journalist and former editor of City Journal
 David Mamet, playwright and screenwriter
Bethany Mandel, conservative author and commentator
Taylor Marshall, Catholic apologist, writer, former academic, online content producer
Jenny Beth Martin, co-founder of the Tea Party Patriots
Mary Matalin, political consultant (Libertarian)
Robert Stacy McCain, conservative journalist, writer and blogger
Mark McCloskey, personal injury lawyer
Scott McConnell, journalist, founding editor of The American Conservative
Gavin McInnes, Canadian far-right political commentator and founder of Proud Boys
Carolyn D. Meadows, conservative activist and president of the National Rifle Association
Mary Ann Mendoza, Angel mother and anti-semitic conspiracy theorist
Michael the Black Man, conservative activist
Jason Miller, communications strategist and political advisor
Max Miller, deputy campaign manager for Donald Trump's 2020 Campaign
Blake Moore, U.S. Foreign Service Officer
Stephen Moore, writer and co-founder of Club for Growth
Steven W. Mosher, social scientist, anti-abortion activist, President of the Population Research Institute
Deroy Murdock, political commentator
Mario Murillo, author and journalist
Douglas Murray, author, journalist and political commentator.
Paul Murray, Australian radio and TV presenter
Troy Newman, anti-abortion activist and President of Operation Rescue
Malik Obama, half-brother of Barack Obama
Larry O'Connor, radio host
John O'Sullivan, British conservative commentator and President of Danube Institute
Alexander Otaola, YouTube personality, activist for democratic change and human rights in Cuba
Candace Owens, conservative commentator and political activist
Rita Panahi, Australian conservative columnist for The Herald and Weekly Times
George Papadopoulos, convicted felon and former member of the foreign policy advisory panel to Donald Trump's 2016 presidential campaign
Sudhir M. Parikh, Indian-American doctor
Brad Parscale, political advisor and digital consultant
Janet Parshall, radio host
CJ Pearson, political activist
Liz Peek, conservative commentator and business analyst
Charlotte Pence Bond, writer and daughter of Mike Pence
Karen Pence, schoolteacher, painter, Second Lady of the United States (2017–2021), and wife of Mike Pence
Austin Petersen, radio host, political commentator and 2016 Libertarian candidate for president
Katrina Pierson, Tea Party activist and communications consultant, national spokesperson for the Donald Trump 2016 presidential campaign
Norman Podhoretz, pundit and writer for Commentary
Andrew Pollack, author, school safety activist, entrepreneur, father of Meadow Pollack
Jon Ponder, thrice-convicted bank robber, founder of the Hope for Prisoners program
Tim Pool, YouTube personality and political commentator
Janet Porter, anti-abortion activist
Jack Posobiec, alt-right political activist and conspiracy theorist
Juan D. Reyes, Republican politician, attorney
Johnathan Lee Riches, professional agitator
Chanel Rion, broadcaster, political cartoonist and children's book author, Chief White House correspondent for OAN
Kyle Rittenhouse, later acquitted-suspect in the Kenosha Unrest Shooting, second amendment activist
Geraldo Rivera, journalist, attorney, author, political commentator, and former host of Geraldo (also endorses Kanye West)
Lew Rockwell chairman of the Mises Institute
Rick Roberts, radio host
Wayne Allyn Root, conservative activist, radio host and the Libertarian Party's vice presidential nominee for the 2008 presidential elections
Joel C. Rosenberg, American-Israeli author
Dave Rubin, political commentator and host of The Rubin Report
Austin Ruse, conservative activist and President of the Center for Family and Human Rights
Joey Salads, YouTube personality, and prankster
Maria Elvira Salazar, television personality and new anchor, and 2020 Republican nominee for the U.S. House for Florida's 27th district. (She would later win said election)
Michael Savage, author, conservative commentator and radio host
Andrew Schlafly, lawyer and founder of Conservapedia
Manny Sethi, physician and orthopedic trauma surgeon
Buck Sexton, radio host and television talk show host, author, and conservative commentator
Ben Shapiro, editor-at-large of The Daily Wire
Greg Sheridan, journalist and editor for The Australian
Sampat Shivangi, physician
Diamond and Silk, live-stream video bloggers, social media personalities and political activists
Dimitri Simes, President of Center for the National Interest and publisher of The National Interest
Roger L. Simon, novelist, screenwriter and analyst at The Epoch Times
Vanila Singh, physician, professor
Helen Smith, forensic psychologist
Lee Smith, journalist and Senior Fellow at Hudson Institute
Bo Snerdley, call screener, producer and engineer for The Rush Limbaugh Show
Angela Stanton-King, public speaker and Republican candidate for Georgia's 5th congressional district in the 2020 elections (She would later lose said election)
Todd Starnes, conservative columnist, commentator and radio host
Harry Stein, author, columnist and editor at City Journal
Roger Stone, conservative political consultant, lobbyist, and convicted felon (Granted pardon by Trump in July 2020)
Marsha Petrie Sue, author, public speaker, motivational coach
Cheryl Sullenger, anti-abortion activist and Vice President of Operation Rescue
Carol M. Swain, conservative television analyst
Tang Baiqao, Chinese dissident and democracy activist, student leader of the Tiananmen Square protests
Enrique Tarrio, businessman, chairman of the far-right organization Proud Boys and Florida state director of the grassroots organization Latinos for Trump
Leo Terrell, civil rights attorney and talk radio host (Democrat)
Randall Terry, anti-abortion activist and founder of Operation Rescue
Philip Terzian, journalist and writer at The Washington Examiner
Cal Thomas, columnist, author and pundit
Clay Travis, writer, lawyer, radio host, and television analyst
Lara Trump, former television producer, senior advisor for the Donald Trump 2020 presidential campaign and daughter-in-law of Donald Trump
Melania Trump, former model, businesswoman, First Lady of the United States (2017-2021), and wife of Donald Trump
R. Emmett Tyrell, author, columnist and editor-in-chief of The American Spectator
Bob Vander Plaats, President of The Family Leader
Gary Varvel, editorial cartoonist for The Indianapolis Star
Michael Voris, Catholic author and apologist
Tonette Walker, wife of Scott Walker
Wang Dan, Chinese dissident and democracy activist, student leader of the Tiananmen Square protests
Wang Juntao, Chinese dissident and democracy activist, student leader of the Tiananmen Square protests
Jesse Watters, conservative political commentator, co-host of The Five Conservative (N.Y.)
Diana West, author and columnist
Liz Wheeler, conservative political commentator
Bill White, former president of the Intrepid Sea, Air & Space Museum
Armstrong Williams, author and commentator
Lauren Witzke, far-right activist and conspiracy theorist
Jacob Wohl, far-right conspiracy theorist, fraudster, and internet troll
Milo Yiannopoulos, far-right political commentator, polemicist, public speaker and writer
Erica Yuen, Hong Kong politician, political activist, businesswoman, actress, presenter and former beauty queen
Marc Zell, Israeli-American lawyer and Vice President of Republican Overseas

Religious leaders

Ché Ahn, pastor
Jim Bakker, televangelist and convicted fraudster
Irvin Baxter Jr, Oneness Pentecostal minister and founder and President of Endtime Ministries
Mark Burns, televangelist and pastor
C. L. Bryant, Baptist minister
Kenneth Copeland, televangelist
Paul Crouch Jr, Christian broadcaster
James Dobson, Christian author and founder of Focus on the Family
Shmuel Eliyahu, Chief Rabbi of Tzfat
Jerry Falwell Jr., President of Liberty University (2007–2020) and prominent member of the Evangelical Christian community
Jentezen Franklin, pastor and televangelist
Jim Garlow, former pastor of Skyline Church
Paul Goulet, pastor
Franklin Graham, evangelical leader and son of Billy Graham
Wayne Grudem, theologian at the Phoenix Seminary
John Hagee, pastor, televangelist and founder and Chair of Christians United for Israel
Skip Heitzig, pastor
E.W. Jackson, pastor
Harry Jackson Jr, pastor and Pentecostal bishop (Deceased)
Yosef Yitzchak Jacobson, Chabad rabbi
Robert Jeffress, Southern Baptist pastor of the First Baptist Church
David Jeremiah, pastor
Bill Johnson, senior leader at Bethel Church
Shmuel Kamenetsky, Haredi rabbi, co-founder and Rosh Yeshiva of Talmudical Yeshiva of Philadelphia
Dov Lior, Chief Rabbi of Kiryat Arba
John MacArthur, pastor of Grace Community Church
Guillermo Maldonado, pastor of the King Jesus Ministry
Albert Mohler, theologian and President of the Southern Baptist Theological Seminary
Hyung Jin Moon, pastor
Johnnie Moore Jr, evangelical leader
Chris Oyakhilome, Nigerian pastor and televangelist
Frank Pavone, Catholic priest and anti-abortion activist
Steven Pruzansky, Orthodox rabbi
Yisroel Reisman, rosh yeshiva at Yeshiva Torah Vodaas
Moshe Reuven Azman, Chief Rabbi of brodski synagouge in Kyiv
Shlomo Riskin, Orthodox rabbi and founder of the Lincoln Square Synagogue
James Robison, televangelist
Samuel Rodriguez, pastor
Sid Roth, televangelist
Darrell C. Scott, pastor
Don Stewart, Pentecostal minister and televangelist
Carlo Maria Viganò, archbishop and former Apostolic Nuncio to the United States
Paula White, pastor, author, televangelist
Andrew Wommack, pastor and televangelist
George Wood, Pentecostal minister

Organizations

Activist groups

60 Plus Association
ACT! for America
American Energy Alliance
Americans for Limited Government
Associated Builders and Contractors
Billy Graham Evangelistic Association
Brigade 2506 Veteran's Association
California Republican Assembly
CatholicVote.org
Center for Arizona Policy
Christian Civic League of Maine
Citizens United
Club for Growth
College Republican National Committee
Committee to Defend the President
The Conservative Caucus
Deplorable Pride
Eagle Forum
Empower Texans
Faith and Freedom Coalition
Family Policy Alliance
Family Policy Alliance of Kansas
Focus on the Family
FreedomWorks
Gays for Trump
Groypers
Hindu Sena
Illinois Family Association
Latinos for Trump
Log Cabin Republicans
Michigan Farm Bureau
Minnesota Citizens Concerned for Life
National Diversity Coalition for Trump
National Federation of Republican Assemblies
National Federation of Republican Women
National Republican Congressional Committee
National Rifle Association
National Right to Life Committee
New York State Rifle and Pistol Association
New York Young Republican Club
Oath Keepers
Ohio Right to Life
Operation Rescue
Pasadena Republican Club
Patriot Prayer
Pennsylvania Young Republicans
Priests for Life
Promise Keepers
Proud Boys (endorsement rejected by Trump)
Republican Hindu Coalition
Republican Jewish Coalition
Republican National Hispanic Assembly
Republican National Lawyers Association
Republicans Overseas
Republican State Leadership Committee
Students for Trump
Tea Party Express
Tea Party Patriots
Texas Alliance for Life
Three Percenters
Virginia Women for Trump
Wisconsin Family Council
Wisconsin Manufacturers & Commerce
Women for Trump
Young Republicans

Political action committees 

America First Action
American Crossroads
Campaign for Working Families
Club for Growth Action
Great America Committee
Great America PAC
Huck PAC
Political Victory Fund
Tea Party Patriots Citizens Fund
Texas Patriots PAC
Trump Victory
Turning Point Action

Unions
Amtrak Fraternal Order of Police, representing 452
Chicago Fraternal Order of Police, representing 14,086
Dallas Police Association, representing 4,000
Detectives' Endowment Association, representing 17,200
Florida Police Benevolent Association, representing 30,000
Fraternal Order of Police, representing 355,000
International Union of Police Associations, representing 19,200
Las Vegas Metro Police Managers and Supervisors Association
Louisiana State Troopers Association
Massachusetts Police Association, representing 18,000
Milwaukee Police Association, representing 1,868
Nassau County Police Benevolent Union, representing 2,400
National Association of Police Organizations, representing 362,000
National Border Patrol Council, representing 18,000
National Immigration and Customs Enforcement Council, representing 7,600
North Las Vegas Police Officers Association, representing 398
Pennsylvania State Troopers Association, representing 9,200
Philadelphia Firefighters and Paramedics Union, representing 4,500 (upheld endorsement after vote in October 2020)
Police Benevolent Association of the City of New York, representing 24,000
Police Officers Association of Michigan, representing 12,000
Public Safety Alliance of Nevada, representing 10,000
Reno Police Protective Association, representing 330
Retired Police Association of New York, representing 5,000
Sergeants Benevolent Association, representing 11,000
St. Louis Police Officers' Association, representing 1802
Suffolk County Police Benevolent Association, representing 2,349
Tucson Police Officer's Association, representing 807

Magazines and newspapers

Radio stations 

 WVIP
 WVOX

Websites
Church Militant
Jexodus
Occidental Observer
Power Line
TheDonald.win
The Save Jersey Blog
Vos Iz Neias?

Native American tribes
Crow Tribe of Montana

See also
List of Republicans who opposed the Donald Trump 2020 presidential campaign
Endorsements in the 2020 Republican Party presidential primaries
List of Donald Trump 2016 presidential campaign endorsements
List of former Trump administration officials who endorsed Joe Biden
List of Joe Biden 2020 presidential campaign endorsements
List of Jo Jorgensen 2020 presidential campaign endorsements
List of Howie Hawkins 2020 presidential campaign endorsements
News media endorsements in the 2020 United States presidential primaries

References 

Trump, Donald, non-political
Trump 2020, Donald, non-political
endorsements, non-political, list
2020 presidential campaign endorsements, non-political